Kehlhof railway station is a railway station in the municipality of Berg, in the Swiss canton of Thurgau. It is an intermediate stop on the standard gauge Wil–Kreuzlingen line of THURBO.

Services 
The following services stop at Kehlhof:

 St. Gallen S-Bahn : half-hourly service from Weinfelden to Konstanz.

References

External links 
 
 

Railway stations in the canton of Thurgau
THURBO stations